Almas is a genus of troodontid theropod dinosaur from the Late Cretaceous of Mongolia. It contains a single species, Almas ukhaa, named in 2017 by Pei Rui and colleagues, based on a partial articulated skeleton. The only known specimen was found in the Djadochta Formation, which is late Campanian in age.

Discovery and naming
In 1993, a joint expedition by the American Museum of Natural History and the Mongolian Academy of Sciences discovered near Ukhaa Tolgod, the Flaming Cliffs, a skeleton of a small theropod. It was prepared by Amy Davidson. Though in subsequent years its traits were inserted in some data matrices of phylogenetic analyses, a description of the fossil was never published.

In 2017, the type species Almas ukhaa was named and described by Pei Rui, Mark Norell, Daniel Barta, Gabriel Bever, Michael Pittman and Xu Xing. The generic name refers to the almas, "wild man" in Mongolian, a man-like creature from Mongolian folklore. The specific name refers to its provenance.

The holotype, IGM 100/1323, was found in a layer of the Djadochta Formation dating from the late Campanian. It consists of a partial skeleton with skull. The skull, better preserved, was found disarticulated from the postcrania, but was considered to have belonged to the same individual. Parts of the skull roof, as well as the lower jaws, were found disconnected from the remainder of the head. The postcranial skeleton contains three sacral vertebrae, eleven front tail vertebrae, belly ribs, parts of the pelvis and parts of the hindlimbs, which lack the toes. It represents a subadult individual. Near the skeleton egg shells have been found of the Prismatoolithidae type. Such eggs have earlier been referred to Troodontidae.

See also
2017 in archosaur paleontology

References

Troodontids
Djadochta fauna
Fossil taxa described in 2017